The 2008 FIG Rhythmic Gymnastics World Cup Final was the eighth edition of the Rhythmic Gymnastics World Cup Final, held from October 4 to October 6, 2008 in Benidorm, Spain. The competition was officially organized by the International Gymnastics Federation as the last stage of a series of competitions through the 2007–2008 season.

Medalists

Medal table

References

Rhythmic Gymnastics World Cup
International gymnastics competitions hosted by Spain
2008 in gymnastics
Benidorm